Carrick Swan GAA is a Gaelic Athletic Association club, located in the town of Carrick-on-Suir in south County Tipperary in Ireland.  It is one of three GAA clubs in the town, one of which, St. Molleran's, is in County Waterford in the southern suburb of Carrickbeg. The Swan are predominantly a hurling club and lead the roll of honour for the number of South Tipperary senior hurling championships won. The club enjoys a keen rivalry with the longer established Carrick Davins, named in honour of Maurice Davin, first President of the GAA who lived at Deerpark near the town. They have one of the best setups for underage youngsters in the county with numerous county titles been won underage. The Swans' most famous players were the Wall brothers, Willie and Tom who played with distinction for Tipperary in the 1940s.

Honours
 Tipperary Senior Hurling Championship: (1) 1947
 South Tipperary Senior Hurling Championship: (24) 1933, 1935, 1936, 1939, 1944, 1945, 1946, 1947, 1948, 1950, 1952, 1958, 1959, 1974, 1978, 1983, 1984, 1985, 1986, 1990, 2000, 2010, 2017, 2022
 Tipperary Intermediate Football Championship: (2) 1999, 2009
 South Tipperary Intermediate Football Championship: (6) 1975, 1982, 1985, 1997, 1999, 2009
 South Tipperary Junior A Football Championship: (2) 1974, 2009
 Tipperary Junior B Football Championship: (1) 2008
 South Tipperary Junior B Football Championship: (2) 1999, 2008
 South Tipperary Junior Hurling Championship: (6) 1928, 1932, 1943, 1955, 1965, 1984
 Tipperary Junior B Hurling Championship: (1) 1994
 South Tipperary Junior B Hurling Championship: (3) 1994, 2003, 2016
 South Tipperary Under-21 A Football Championship: (1) 2005
 South Tipperary Under-21 B Football Championship: (3) 1991, 1999, 2013
 Tipperary Under-21 A Hurling Championship: (1) 1972
 South Tipperary Under-21 A Hurling Championship: (12) 1962, 1971, 1972, 1973, 1974, 1982, 1983, 2006, 2007, 2008, 2013, 2015
 South Tipperary Under-21 B Hurling Championship: (2) 2003, 2011
 Tipperary Minor B Football Championship: (3) 1987, 1997, 2003
 South Tipperary Minor B Football Championship: (3) 1987, 1997, 2003
 Tipperary Minor A Hurling Championship: (1) 2004
 South Tipperary Minor Hurling Championship: (16) 1940, 1942, 1948, 1956, 1969, 1970, 1971, 1973, 1976, 1981, 1982, 1983, 2003, 2004, 2005, 2013
 South Tipperary Minor B Hurling Championship: (2) 1988, 2010

Notable players
 Jimmy Cooney
 Séamus Mackey
 Willie Wall
 Tommy Wall

References

External links
Official Carrick Swan GAA Club website
Tipperary GAA site

Hurling clubs in County Tipperary
Gaelic games clubs in County Tipperary